Kerry Football Club may refer to two unrelated association football clubs:
Kerry F.C. (Ireland), founded in 2022 and based in Tralee, County Kerry
Kerry F.C. (Wales), founded in 1876 and based in Kerry, Powys